Söderholm or Soderholm may refer to the following individuals:

Eric Soderholm (born 1948), former Major League Baseball third baseman
Glen Soderholm, Canadian Contemporary Christian, singer-songwriter and minister in Rockwood, Ontario, Canada
Jan-Christian Söderholm (born 1976), Finnish actor
Jeanette Söderholm, Swedish singer of Jamaican origin
Stefan Söderholm (born 1979), Swedish Bandy player who currently plays for Sandvikens AIK as a midfielder
Toni Söderholm (born 1978), Finnish professional ice hockey defenceman, currently playing for HIFK in the SM-liiga

Swedish-language surnames